Lauri Kiiski (born 10 October 1980) is a Finnish tennis player.

Kiiski has a career high ATP singles ranking of 427 achieved on 9 September 2002. He also has a career high ATP doubles ranking of 300 achieved on 29 July 2002.

Kiiski represented Finland at the Davis Cup where he had a W/L record of 2–2.

See also
List of Finland Davis Cup team representatives

References

External links

1980 births
Living people
Finnish male tennis players
Sportspeople from Tampere